Choe Hang (1209 – 17 May 1257) was the third dictator of the Choe Military regime, which dominated Goryeo for six decades before and during the Mongol invasions. Choe Hang continued on his predecessor Choe U's anti-Mongol policy, and refused to surrender to the invaders. It is believed that the Choe Military Regime began to decline during his eight-year reign.

Background and Rise to Power 
Choe Hang was born the son of Choe U, the second dictator of the Choe Military regime, and a concubine. His grandfather, Choe Chungheon, was the founder of the military regime, and the second head of the Ubong Choe clan. Choe Hang spent most of his youth in the Cholla Provinces studying Son Buddhism thought as a monk with his brother Manjong. Choe Hang's father, Choe U, originally intended for his son-in-law, Kim Yakson, and then his grandson, Kim Mi, to be his successors, but both were exiled and banished as a result of disagreements. Upon seeing the need to secure an heir, Choe U decided on establishing Hang as his successor. Choe U called Hang in from the Cholla Provinces and placed him in the tutelage of some of Goryeo's finest scholars of the time. Hang was promoted to Minister of Revenue, and within a year, he entered into the Security Council. Around this time, Hang was given five hundred house soldiers. Finally, in the eleventh month of 1249, Choe U died, after which the Choe bodyguards almost instantly went to guard Hang's house.

Reign 
Upon officially becoming the next Choe dictator in 1249, Choe Hang took rapid steps to securing his position. He first eliminated officials, concubines and followers of his father, the greatest among which was the Tae family. He also eliminated all former supporters of Kim Mi, who had been banished by Choe U. He also banished many popular government figures such as Min Hui and Kim Kyongson. King Gojong bestowed the title of 'Duke of Chinyang', which was a title that Choe U had been given, on Choe Hang. Shortly after, Hang was promoted to the Head of Security Council, the Ministries of Civil Personnel and Military Affairs.

Family
Father: Choe U (1166 - 10 December 1249) (최우)
Grandfather: Choe Chung-heon (1149 - 29 October 1219) (최충헌)
Grandmother: Lady Song (부인 송씨)
Mother: Lady Seo Ryeon-bang (서련방) – a prostitute.
Wives and their issue(s):
Lady, of the Cheorwon Choe clan (부인 철원 최씨) – No issue.
Lady, of the Hoengseong Jo clan (부인 횡성 조씨) – No issue.
Unnamed concubine
Choe Ui (1238 - 1258) (최의)
Lady Sim Gyeong (심경) – No issue.

Popular culture
 Portrayed by Baek Do-bin in the 2012 MBC TV series God of War.

References

See also 
Goryeo
Choe Chungheon
Goryeo military regime

13th-century Korean people
Goryeo Buddhists
Choe clan of Ubong
1257 deaths
Year of birth unknown
1209 births
Korean generals
Regents of Korea